Caldwell is an English and Scottish surname. Notable people with the surname include:

List

A
 Alastair Caldwell (born 1943) British Formula One motor-racing team manager
 Alexander Caldwell (1830–1917), American politician from Kansas
 Alexander Caldwell (Virginia judge) (1774–1839), American federal judge from Virginia
 Alfred Caldwell (1903–1998), American landscape architect
 Andre Caldwell (born 1985), American football player
 Andrew Caldwell (disambiguation), multiple people
 Anne Caldwell (1868–1936), American librettist
 Arthur Caldwell (disambiguation), multiple people

B
 Ben Caldwell (disambiguation), multiple people
 Billy Caldwell (1782–1841), also known as Sauganash, Potawatomi-British settler near Chicago
 Blake Caldwell (born 1984), American road bicycle racer
 Bobby Caldwell (1951–2023), American singer-songwriter
 Bobby Caldwell (drummer), American rock drummer
 Bruce Caldwell (disambiguation), multiple people
 Buddy Caldwell (born 1946), American politician and lawyer from Louisiana

C
 Cecil Caldwell (born 1977), American football player
 Charles Caldwell (disambiguation), multiple people
 C. Pope Caldwell (1875–1940), American Representative from New York
 Christopher Caldwell (journalist) (born 1962), American journalist
 Clive Caldwell (1910–1994), Australian fighter ace
 Clyde Caldwell, American illustrator
 Colbert Caldwell (1822-1892), Justice of the Texas Supreme Court
 Columbus Caldwell (1830-1908), American politician
 Craig Caldwell (born 1973), New Zealand darts player

D
 Daniel Caldwell (1935–2015), American actor, stage director and teacher
 David Caldwell (disambiguation), multiple people
 Drew Caldwell (born 1960), Canadian politician from Manitoba

E
 Enda Caldwell (born 1975), Irish radio personality and voice actor
 Erskine Caldwell (1903–1987), American writer

F
 Francis Caldwell (c. 1860–1934), British police officer
 Francis Xavier Caldwell (1792–1851), historical figure from Upper Canada
 Frank Merrill Caldwell (1866-1937), United States Army officer
 Frederick Heath-Caldwell (1858–1945), British Army officer and RAF general

G
 Gail Caldwell (born 1951), American critic
 Gary Caldwell (born 1982), Scottish footballer
 George Caldwell (disambiguation), multiple people
 Greene Washington Caldwell (1806–1864), American Representative from North Carolina

H
 Harmon White Caldwell (1899–1977), American university president
 Henry Caldwell (disambiguation)
 Herschel Caldwell (1903–1989) American college football player and coach
 H. H. Caldwell (1873–1939), American submarine captain

I
 Ian Caldwell (born 1976), American writer
 Isaac Caldwell (1795–1836), Justice of the Supreme Court of Mississippi
 Isaac Caldwell (died 1885) (1825–1885), American lawyer and educator

J
 James Caldwell (disambiguation), multiple people
 Joe Caldwell (born 1941), American basketball player
 Joe Caldwell (archaeologist) (1916–1973), American archaeologist
 John Caldwell (disambiguation), multiple people
 Joseph Caldwell (1773–1835), American mathematician
 Joseph Pearson Caldwell (1808–1853), American representative from North Carolina

K
 Karen K. Caldwell (born 1956), Chief United States District Judge for the Eastern District of Kentucky
 Keith Caldwell (1895–1980), New Zealand flying ace
 Kimberly Caldwell (born 1982), American television host
 Kirk Caldwell (born 1952), American politician; mayor of Honolulu, Hawaii
 Knute Cauldwell (1896–1952), American football player

L
 Lewis A. H. Caldwell (1905-1993), American politician
 L. Jay Caldwell (1871–1950), American football player and coach
 Lynton K. Caldwell (1913–2006), American political scientist

M
 Malcolm Caldwell (1931–1978), British Marxist academic
 Mathew Caldwell (1798–1842), Texas settler and military figure
 Matt Caldwell (born 1981), American politician from Florida
 Michael Caldwell (born 1989), American politician from Georgia
 Mike Caldwell (disambiguation), multiple people
 Millard F. Caldwell (1897–1984), American politician from Florida

N
 Nancy Abbate Caldwell (born 1941/1942), American entertainer and dance teacher
 Nicholas Caldwell (1944–2016), American R&B singer, original member of The Whispers

O
 Olli Caldwell (born 2002), British racing driver

P
 Patrick C. Caldwell (1801–1855), American Representative from South Carolina
 Philip Caldwell (1920–2013), American businessman of the Ford Motor Company
 Phoebe Caldwell, known for her work with autistic children

R
 Ralph Caldwell (1884–1969), American baseball pitcher
 Ravin Caldwell (born 1963), American football linebacker 
 Ray Caldwell (1888–1967), American baseball pitcher
 Reche Caldwell (born 1979), American football player
 Robert Caldwell (disambiguation), multiple people
 Rogers Caldwell (1890–1968), American businessman and banker from Tennessee
 Ron Caldwell (born 1951), American politician from Arkansas
 Ronnie Caldwell (1948–1967), American musician
 Ross Caldwell (born 1993), Scottish footballer
 Ryan Caldwell (born 1981), Canadian ice hockey player

S
 Sam Caldwell (1892–1953), American oilman and Louisiana politician
 Samuel Caldwell (disambiguation), multiple people
 Sara Caldwell (born 1961), American author and screenwriter/filmmaker
 Sarah Caldwell (1924–2006), American opera conductor, impresario and stage director
 Sophie Caldwell (1990), American cross-country skier
 Spence Caldwell (1909–1983), Canadian broadcasting pioneer
 Steven Caldwell (born 1980), Scottish footballer
 Susan Caldwell (born 1958), English chess master

T
 Talent Caldwell, American comics artist
 Taylor Caldwell (1900–1985), Anglo-American novelist
 Thomas Caldwell (disambiguation), multiple people
 Tod Robinson Caldwell (1818–1874), American politician; governor of North Carolina
 Tracy Caldwell Dyson (born 1969), American astronaut
 Tommy Caldwell (born 1978), American rock climber
 Tommy Caldwell (musician) (1949–1980), bassist/vocalist for The Marshall Tucker Band
 Tom Caldwell (1921–2002), Irish politician, interior designer, and art dealer
 Tony Caldwell (born 1961), American football linebacker
 Toy Caldwell (1947–1993), American musician

W
 Walter G. Caldwell (1886–1934), American politician
 William Caldwell (disambiguation), multiple people
 Wilson Caldwell (1841–1898), African-American Civil War era community leader

Z
 Zoe Caldwell (1933–2020), Australian actress

Fictional characters
 Cecile Caldwell, in Cruel Intentions
 Dan Caldwell, in The Andy Griffith Show
 Minnie Caldwell, in Coronation Street
 Patricia Caldwell, US president in Tom Clancy's Splinter Cell: Conviction
 Steven Caldwell (Stargate), in Stargate Atlantis

 Linus Caldwell, in Ocean's Eleven and  sequels
 Richard "Ricky" Caldwell (born Richard Chapman), in Silent Night, Deadly Night series

See also
 Cauldwell (disambiguation)
 Caldwell (given name)
 Justice Caldwell (disambiguation)

English-language surnames
Scottish surnames